Frailea pygmaea is a species of Frailea from Bolivia, Argentina, and Uruguay.

References

External links
 
 

pygmaea
Cacti of South America
Flora of Argentina
Flora of Bolivia
Flora of Uruguay